The Manchester, Bury and Rossendale Railway, opened in 1846, ran between Clifton, Bury and Rossendale in Lancashire, England.  The company merged with the Blackburn, Burnley, Accrington & Colne Extension Railway (BBA&CER) to form the East Lancashire Railway.

History

In the early 1840s the nearest railway to Bury was the Manchester and Bolton Railway, at its closest through Stoneclough almost 4.5 miles distant.  This railway company had initially proposed to create a branch to Bury, but technical difficulties meant that the connection never materialised.

On 14 September 1843, a group of local businessmen including John Grundy, Thomas Wrigley and John Robinson Kay met at a hostelry in Bury to discuss the creation of a railway connection for the town.  The Manchester, Bury and Rossendale Railway Company was formed, its purpose to build a railway from Bury to a junction with the Manchester and Bolton Railway at Clifton.  The company also promoted the idea of extending the line northwards to Rawtenstall.  In 1844, the company was incorporated by act of parliament, which authorized it to raise £300,000, and to borrow £100,000.

Route

Charles E. Cawley was appointed Chief Engineer, who instructed his recently appointed assistant Frederick Banister to set out the first few miles. The proposed route through the Irwell Valley was then approved by Chief Inspector of Railways Major General Sir Charles W. Pasley on 23 September 1846.

The railway began from a junction with the Manchester and Bolton Railway, in Clifton. Construction was completed quickly; William Harrison wrote "The railway was speedily completed and was opened for traffic on 28th September 1846", however men were asked to work on Sunday, and several were charged with breaking Sabbath.

Extension
The two companies joined on 24 July 1845 to form the East Lancashire Railway

Banister was placed in charge with designing, surveying and gaining the necessary UK Parliament approval to extend the line, which hence became part of the Lancashire and Yorkshire Railway. Due to persistent health issues, after gaining parliamentary approval Banister left the project and construction was undertaken by engineers from the L&YR.

Present day
The Manchester to Clifton section today forms part of the Manchester to Preston line. The line from Clifton towards Bury has been lifted, with Molyneux Brow total removed due to construction of the M60 motorway. The section beyond Ringley Road to Withins Lane now forms the Irwell Sculpture Trail. Beyond this Manchester Metrolink incurs onto the former railway infrastructure, with the line from Bury Bolton Street to Bolton now being utilised by the preserved East Lancashire Railway.

References

Bibliography

 
 

Early British railway companies
Railway companies established in 1843
History of the Metropolitan Borough of Bury
History of Lancashire
Irwell Valley
1843 establishments in England
British companies established in 1843
Closed railway lines in Greater Manchester